Stéphane François (born 1 January 1973) is a French political scientist who specializes on radical right-wing movements. He also studies conspiracy theories, political ecology and countercultures.

Life and career 
Born on 1 January 1973, Stéphane François attended Lille 2 University of Health and Law, where he obtained a PhD in political science after a doctoral thesis on the "Paganism of the Nouvelle Droite."

An associate member of the CNRS, he has been a member of the Observatoire des radicalités politiques ("Observatory of political radicalism") since 2014, and a researcher in the Groupe Sociétés, Religions, Laïcités ("Societies, Religions, Secularism Group"). François is also a lecturer in contemporary history and political science at the University of Valenciennes.

Works 

 La Musique europaïenne. Ethnographie politique d’une subculture de droite, preface by Jean-Yves Camus, Paris, L’Harmattan, 2006. 
 Le Néo-paganisme : une vision du monde en plein essor (preface by Jean-François Mayer), Apremont, 2007 .
 Les Néo-paganismes et la Nouvelle Droite : pour une autre approche (preface by Philippe Raynaud), Archè, 2008 
 Le complot cosmique. Théorie du complot, ovnis, théosophie et extrémistes politiques (with Emmanuel Kreis), Archè, 2010 . 
 L'Ésotérisme, la « tradition » et l'initiation. Essai de définition, Grammata, 2011 
 La Nouvelle Droite et la tradition, Archè, 2012 
 À droite de l'acacia : de la nature réelle de la Franc-maçonnerie ?, La Hutte, 2012 
 L'écologie politique : Une vision du monde réactionnaire ? Réflexions sur le positionnement idéologique de quelques valeur, Cerf, 2012 
 La Modernité en procès : éléments d'un refus du monde moderne, Presses universitaires de Valenciennes, 2013 .
 Au-delà des vents du Nord : l'extrême-droite française, le pôle Nord et les Indo-Européens (preface by Laurent Olivier), Presses universitaires de Lyon, 2014 .
Histoire de la haine identitaire : mutations et diffusions de l'altérophobie (with Nicolas Lebourg), Presses universitaires de Valenciennes 2016 .
 Le Retour de Pan : panthéisme, néo-paganisme et antichristianisme dans l'écologie radicale, Archè, 2016 .
Le Service public et les idéologies politiques (with Emmanuel Cherrier), Villeneuve-d'Ascq, Presses universitaires du Septentrion, 2016 .
 
 Le rejet de l'Occident : l'ésotérisme, le complotisme et le refus de la société libérale, Paris, Dervy, 2020 .
 La Nouvelle Droite et ses dissidences : identité, écologie et paganisme, Lormont, Le Bord de l'Eau, 2021 .
 Les Vert-bruns. L'écologie de l'extrême droite française, Le Bord de l'Eau, 2022 .

References

Living people
1973 births
French political scientists
Academics and writers on far-right extremism
Pagan studies scholars
Western esotericism scholars